Kenyan carpet viper is a common name that may refer to either or both of the following subspecies, both of which are found in Kenya:

 Echis pyramidum aliaborri Drews & Sacherer, 1974
 Echis pyramidum leakeyi Stemmler & Sochurek, 1969

References